On December 30, 2020, Speaker of the United States House of Representatives Nancy Pelosi announced that the United States House of Representatives would create a select committee on "economic disparity and fairness in growth" to produce a report with legislative recommendations to address the worsening crisis of wealth and income inequality across the United States.

Members, 117th Congress
Pelosi announced the committee's Democratic members on June 16, 2021, and they were formally appointed the following day.

References

External link 
 Archived version of the now-defunct official site

Economic Disparity and Fairness in Growth
Economic Disparity and Fairness in Growth